Laurent Dabos (1761–1835) was a French painter of portraits and of historical and genre subjects.

Life
Dabos was born at Toulouse in 1761. He studied with François André Vincent, and first exhibited at the "Exposition de la Jeunesse" in 1788. His works included  Mary of England, Queen of France, lamenting the death of her husband, Louis XII, The Return of the Grande Armée,  and Louis XVI. writing his Will, a picture painted in the Temple during the captivity of the royal family. Besides these he painted from life the portrait of the Dauphin (Louis XVII). He died in Paris in 1835. His wife, Jeanne Bernard, who was a pupil of Madame Guyard, also painted genre subjects. She was born at Luneville in 1763, and died in 1842.

Gallery

References

Sources
 

1761 births
1835 deaths
18th-century French painters
French male painters
19th-century French painters
Artists from Toulouse
19th-century French male artists
18th-century French male artists